Catherine "Cathy" Wedge (born 29 December 1950) is a Canadian equestrian who rode several times on the Canadian Equestrian Team between 1971 and 1978.

Early years
Catherine Wedge was born on 29 December 1950 in Saskatoon, Saskatchewan, Canada.
She began to ride at the Saskatoon Pony Club when she was eight.
Wynona Mulcaster was the unpaid instructor at the club from 1945 to 1973 and influenced Wedge's career.

Equestrian career

Wedge entered international competition in 1969, when she won the Working Hunter Championship at the Seattle International Horse Show.
At the 1971 Pan American Games in Cali, Colombia she won gold in the three-day team event riding her horse "Sumatra".
She was named to the Canadian Olympic team for 1972, but could not compete due to a broken leg.
In 1974 she won the Canadian three-day-event on "City Fella".
In 1975 Wedge received serious arm and leg injuries in a competition in Massachusetts shortly before an event in Bromont, Quebec where she was scheduled to be part of the Canadian team. The coordinator of the event called her "the most artistic rider we had".

She again rode "City Fella".
She placed 23rd in the mixed three-day individual equestrianism event, and her team placed 6th in the mixed three-day team equestrianism event.
Wedge rode "Abracadabra" in the Canadian team that won gold at the 1978 Eventing World Championship.
"Abracadabra" was the second horse of team captain Elizabeth Ashton.

Justice of Supreme Court of British Columbia

Catherine Wedge, a Supreme Court of British Columbia, Canada justice was appointed to the Supreme Court of  British Columbia in 2001 .

References
Citations

Sources

1950 births
Living people
Canadian female equestrians
Olympic equestrians of Canada
Equestrians at the 1976 Summer Olympics
Pan American Games medalists in equestrian
Pan American Games gold medalists for Canada
Equestrians at the 1971 Pan American Games
Sportspeople from Saskatoon
Medalists at the 1971 Pan American Games
20th-century Canadian women
21st-century Canadian women